American Grafishy is the third studio album by the San Francisco-based punk rock band Flipper. It was released in 1992 by Def American; label president Rick Rubin had once been in a Flipper tribute band. The album title is a pun on the coming-of-age film American Graffiti. The band promoted the album with a North American tour.

Production
The album was produced by Flipper. The opening and closing tracks allude to former bandmember Will Shatter's death. John Dogherty replaced Shatter on bass.

Critical reception

Trouser Press noted that "the band’s patented approach to noise still packs a punch." The Chicago Reader deemed American Grafishy a "feeble reunion album." The Boston Globe called it "semi-hooky, appealingly tortured, snarling, gnarled punk." The Toronto Star considered it "hard, lean, exciting, vital."

The Atlanta Journal-Constitution wrote: "What was once radical now sounds rote, and if a band capable of such titanic anarchy can even bother with a career, what does it say about the rest of us number-crunchers, dishwashers and wage slaves?"

Track listing

Personnel 
 Bruce Loose – lead and backing vocals
 Ted Falconi – guitar, illustration
 John Dougherty – bass, backing vocals
 Steve DePace – drums, backing vocals

Other personnel 
 Flipper – producer, art direction
 Rick Rubin – executive producer
 Garry Creiman – associated producer, engineering
 Barrle Goshko – art direction, design
 Tami Herrick-Needham – design
 Jay Blakesberg – photography

References 

Flipper (band) albums
1992 albums
American Recordings (record label) albums